Guarany Sporting Club, commonly known as Guarany de Sobral or just as Guarany, is a Brazilian football club from Sobral, Ceará state. They competed once in the Série B and in the Série C, and won the Série D once.

History 

Guarany Sporting Club was founded on July 2, 1938, at Luiz Nogueira Adeodato's home, located in Sobral, Ceará state. The first members of the club's board of directors were Father José Aloísio Pinto and Luiz Nogueira Adeodato. Guarany won their first title, which was the Campeonato Cearense Second Level, in 1966, winning the competition again in the following year and in 1999. They competed in the Série C in 2001, finishing in the third place, and then being promoted to the Série B in 2002, replacing Malutrom in the competition. The club competed in the Série D in 2010, winning the competition after beating América-AM in the final.

Stadium 
Guarany de Sobral play their home games at Estádio Plácido Aderaldo Castelo, commonly known as Estádio do Junco. The stadium is located in Sobral, Ceará, and has a maximum capacity of 15,000 people.

Achievements 

 Série D:
 Winners (1): 2010
 Campeonato Cearense Second Level:
 Winners (4): 1967, 1999, 2005, 2008

Current squad

References

External links 
  Official website

Football clubs in Ceará
Association football clubs established in 1938
1938 establishments in Brazil
Campeonato Brasileiro Série D winners